Tony Field may refer to:
Tony Field (footballer, born 1942), English football forward from Chester
Tony Field (footballer, born 1946), English football striker from Halifax
Anthony Field (born 1963), Australian musician and actor

See also
Tony Fields (1958–1995), American dancer
Tony Fields II (born 1999), American football player